Thurman is an unincorporated community in Milan Township, Allen County, in the U.S. state of Indiana.

History
A post office was established at Thurman in 1888, and remained in operation until it was discontinued in 1899.

Geography

References

Unincorporated communities in Allen County, Indiana
Unincorporated communities in Indiana
Fort Wayne, IN Metropolitan Statistical Area